Soldiers of Sunrise is the first album by Brazilian heavy metal band Viper released by Rock Brigade Records in 1987. It was re-released by Massacre Records in 1992 and re-released again in 1997 by Paradoxx Music in a 2-in-1 edition with the Theatre of Fate album. In 2013 through WikiMetal a new edition was released, including the six songs of "The Killera Sword" Demo Tape as bonus tracks.

In a 2013 interview, when commenting on the recording of the album, vocalist Andre Matos said:

Track listing
 "Knights of Destruction" — 3:12
 "Nightmares" — 3:36
 "The Whipper" — 3:10
 "Wings of the Evil" — 3:55
 "H.R." — 3:15
 "Soldiers of Sunrise" — 6:52
 "Signs of the Night" — 3:30
 "Killera (Princess of Hell)" — 2:38
 "Law of the Sword" — 4:29

Bonus tracks (WikiMetal Edition):
10. "Law of the Sword" Demo
11. "Signs of the Night" Demo
12. "Nightmares" Demo 
13. "H.R." Demo
14. "The Whipper" Demo
15. "Killera (Princess Of Hell)" Demo

Credits
 André Matos — vocals
 Pit Passarell — bass guitar
 Yves Passarell — lead guitar
 Felipe Machado — lead guitar
 Cassio Audi — drums

OBS: Val Santos was the drummer during most of the tour for this album.
Felipe Machado played at the first show of the tour at Teatro Rio Branco and traveled the next day to finish high school in the US, returning a year later at the end of the tour, before the band starts working on the next album Theatre of Fate.
During his absence was replaced by War Kings guitarist Rodrigo for some of the shows.

References

External links
 Viper official site

1987 albums
Viper (band) albums